School District 59 Peace River South is a school district in northeastern British Columbia near the Alberta border. Centered in Dawson Creek, it includes the communities of Chetwynd, Tumbler Ridge, and Pouce Coupe.

Schools

See also
List of school districts in British Columbia

Peace River Country
Dawson Creek
59